Glengarry—Prescott—Russell is a provincial electoral district in eastern Ontario, Canada. It elects one member to the Legislative Assembly of Ontario.

It was created in 1996 from parts of Prescott and Russell and Stormont—Dundas—Glengarry and East Grenville when ridings were redistributed to match their federal counterparts.

From 1996 to 2005 the riding included the municipalities of Clarence-Rockland, Township of Russell, Alfred and Plantagenet, the Nation, Casselman, Hawkesbury, Champlain, North Glengarry and the eastern half of South Glengarry plus that part of Ottawa located in the former municipality of Cumberland, Ontario except for that part of Cumberland north of Innes Road and west of Trim Road.

In 2005, the riding lost the eastern half of South Glengarry and it also lost that part of the riding between Innes Road and Wall Road west of Trim Road.

Glengarry—Prescott—Russell is a francophone-majority riding.

Members of Provincial Parliament

Election results

2007 electoral reform referendum

References

External links
Map of riding for 2018 election

Ontario provincial electoral districts
Clarence-Rockland
Hawkesbury, Ontario
Provincial electoral districts of Ottawa
Russell, Ontario